Peter Herbert may refer to:

 Peter Herbert (cricketer), Australian cricketer
 Peter Herbert (lawyer), British barrister and political activist
 Peter Herbert (Royal Navy officer) (1929–2019)